K. C. McDermott (born April 18, 1996) is an American football offensive guard who is a free agent. He was signed by the Jacksonville Jaguars as an undrafted free agent in 2018 following his college football career with the Miami Hurricanes.

Professional career

Jacksonville Jaguars
McDermott signed with the Jacksonville Jaguars as an undrafted free agent following the 2018 NFL Draft on April 30, 2018. He was waived during final roster cuts on September 1, 2018, and signed to the team's practice squad the next day.

McDermott signed a futures contract with the Jaguars on December 31, 2018. He suffered an ankle injury in the final 2019 preseason game and was waived/injured during final roster cuts on August 31, 2019. He subsequently reverted to the team's injured reserve list the next day.

McDermott was waived during final roster cuts again on September 5, 2020, and signed to the practice squad on September 7. He was elevated to the active roster on September 24 for the team's week 3 game against the Miami Dolphins, and reverted to the practice squad after the game. He was elevated again on October 3 for the week 4 game against the Cincinnati Bengals, and reverted to the practice squad again following the game. He was placed on the practice squad/COVID-19 list by the team on October 17, 2020, and activated back to the practice squad on November 4. He was signed to the active roster on November 14, 2020.

On August 31, 2021, McDermott was waived by the Jaguars and re-signed to the practice squad the next day. He was promoted to the active roster on October 29, 2021.

On August 29, 2022, McDermott was released by the Jaguars.

New York Giants
On September 12, 2022, the New York Giants signed McDermott to their practice squad. On September 20, 2022, he was released.

Houston Texans
On October 11, 2022, McDermott was signed to the Houston Texans practice squad.

Personal life
McDermott's brother Shane played college football for Miami and spent two seasons in the NFL.

References

External links
Jacksonville Jaguars bio
Miami Hurricanes bio

1996 births
Living people
American football offensive tackles
Miami Hurricanes football players
People from Wellington, Florida
Players of American football from Florida
Sportspeople from the Miami metropolitan area
Jacksonville Jaguars players
New York Giants players
Houston Texans players